Roupa Nova em Londres (Portuguese for Roupa Nova in London) is an album by Brazilian pop band Roupa Nova. It was released in March 2009.

The entire album was recorded at the Abbey Road Studios in London, famous for recordings of the group The Beatles.

The album contains seven new songs: Do Outro Lado da Calçada, Reacender (Shine), Todas Elas, Alguém no Teu Lugar, Mais Feliz, A Cor do Dinheiro and Coração da Terra. It also features four re-workings of old songs: Sonho, Muito Mais, Lembranças and Lennon–McCartney song She's Leaving Home, the latter was performed a cappella and captured in a studio installed inside of a cathedral in London, accompanied only by a string octet.

The tracks "Toma Conta de Mim", "Cantar Faz Feliz o Coração", "Chamado de Amor" and "Quero Você" were taken from their previous EP 4U, released in 2008.

The DVD version features extra material as the scenes of recordings at Abbey Road, a making of and a rewriting of the song "Lumiar", written by Beto Guedes, a former member of the Clube da Esquina.

The album won Latin Grammy Award for Best Brazilian Contemporary Pop Album in 2009.

Reception

Track listing

References 

2009 albums
Latin Grammy Award for Best Portuguese Language Contemporary Pop Album
Portuguese-language albums